Air Guitar Nation is a feature-length 2006 documentary about the first US Air Guitar Championships, following the top contestants, David "C-Diddy" Jung and Dan "Björn Türoque" Crane, to the 2003 World Championship in Oulu, Finland.

The film premiered in 2006 as part of the AFI/Discovery Channel Documentary Film Festival and was then played at the 2007 Adelaide International Film Festival.

See also
Air Guitar in Oulu

External links
 Air Guitar Nation - official website (needs Flash)
 DVDTalk.com Film Review
 Air Guitar Nation Movie Trailer
 
 
 

2006 films
American documentary films
2006 documentary films
2000s English-language films
2000s American films